The discography of Motörhead, an English rock band, consists (as of 2021) of twenty-two studio albums, sixteen live albums, sixteen compilation albums, five extended plays (EPs), three box sets, twenty-nine singles, ten video albums and thirty-four music videos. Motörhead were originally formed in 1975 in London by bassist and vocalist Ian "Lemmy" Kilmister, after his departure from Hawkwind, who drafted in guitarist Larry Wallis and drummer Lucas Fox (who was quickly replaced by Phil "Philthy Animal" Taylor) to complete the band's initial lineup. The trio recorded their debut album for release on United Artists, although it was not released until 1979 as On Parole. "Fast" Eddie Clarke joined the band as a second guitarist soon after this recording was completed, but as it was shelved by United Artists and even though On Parole is chronologically it is the band's first album, Clarke would instead replace Wallis who left soon after Clarke joined for unspecified reasons. It is this trio who would go on to record the band's first released album, the self-titled Motörhead, as a three-piece. Thus, beginning the band's classic line-up and initially issued by Chiswick Records in 1977 (as a favour to Lemmy), reaching number 43 on the UK Albums Chart.

In 1978, Motörhead signed with Bronze Records; their first releases on the label were Overkill and Bomber, both in 1979. The albums reached 24 and 12 respectively in the UK, and both spawned UK top 40 singles in "Overkill" and "Bomber". Motörhead improved further on their chart success with their next two studio albums, Ace of Spades and Iron Fist, which reached 4 and 6 respectively on the UK Albums Chart. In 1981 the group also achieved their first UK number one with their first live album, No Sleep 'til Hammersmith, which was supported by the release of a live recording of "Motörhead" which reached number six in the UK. The band also collaborated with Girlschool (as Headgirl) on the EP St. Valentine's Day Massacre, which reached number 5 in the UK. Clarke left the band in 1982.

Clarke was replaced by former Thin Lizzy guitarist Brian Robertson, who performed on the top-20 album Another Perfect Day. In 1984 Robertson was replaced by Phil Campbell and Michael "Würzel" Burston, while Taylor also left to be replaced by Pete Gill. The new four-piece released Orgasmatron in 1986, which reached number 21 in the UK, before Taylor returned to the band. Rock 'N' Roll and 1916 reached the UK top 40, before Taylor left again during the recording of March ör Die; Mikkey Dee was brought in as his replacement. The band's next three albums – Bastards, Sacrifice and Overnight Sensation – failed to chart in the UK. During the Sacrifice era Würzel left the band which made the band return to its roots as a three-piece line up which would last up until Lemmy's passing in 2015. In 1998 Snake Bite Love reached number 171. Later releases improved in chart success, with the band's final album Bad Magic reaching number ten on the UK Albums Chart.

Albums

Studio albums

Live albums

Compilation albums

Box sets

Extended plays

Singles

Videos

Video albums

Music videos

Other appearances

Notes

References

External links
Motörhead official website
Motörhead discography at Discogs
Motörhead discography at MusicBrainz

Discography
Discographies of British artists
Heavy metal group discographies